Golam Mawla is a Bangladeshi politician from Bogra District of Bangladesh and former member of Parliament elected from Bogra-3 constituency in February 1996.

Career 
Golam Mawla was elected to parliament from Bogra-3 as a Bangladesh Nationalist Party candidate in 15 February 1996 Bangladeshi general election.

References 

Living people
Year of birth missing (living people)
People from Bogra District
Bangladesh Nationalist Party politicians
Bangladeshi military personnel
6th Jatiya Sangsad members